Rachael Splaine Rollins (born March 3, 1971) is an American lawyer and politician who is the United States Attorney for the District of Massachusetts. Rollins was formerly  Suffolk County District Attorney in Massachusetts, which includes the municipalities of Boston, Chelsea, Revere, and Winthrop. Rollins was the first woman to hold the office of Suffolk County D.A. and the first woman of color to serve as a Massachusetts D.A. 

In July 2021, President Joe Biden nominated Rollins to be the United States Attorney for the District of Massachusetts. She is an advocate for criminal justice reform.

Early life and education
Rollins was born in Boston and raised in Cambridge, Massachusetts, the oldest of five children. Her father, a second-generation Irish-American, worked as a teacher. Her maternal grandparents are from Barbados and her mother is a first-generation American. Rollins attended Buckingham Browne & Nichols School and earned a Bachelor of Arts degree in education and African-American studies from the University of Massachusetts Amherst, a Juris Doctor from the Northeastern University School of Law, and a Master of Laws in labor and unemployment law from the Georgetown University Law Center.

Career
Rollins began her legal career as a law clerk to Judge Frederick Brown of the Massachusetts Appeals Court from 1997 to 1998.  From 
1999 to 2002, she was a field attorney for the National Labor Relations Board and from  2002 to 2006, Rollins was an attorney at Bingham McCutchen LLP in their Boston office. Rollins was an assistant United States attorney for the District of Massachusetts from 2007 to 2011. Rollins served as the general counsel to the Massachusetts Department of Transportation from 2011 to 2013 and contemporaneously to the Massachusetts Bay Transportation Authority from 2012 to 2013.  She was chief legal counsel to the Massachusetts Port Authority from 2013 to 2015.

District attorney

Election
During her campaign, Rollins pledged to decriminalize certain offenses, such as shoplifting, drug possession, wanton or malicious destruction of property, drug possession with intent to distribute, driving with a suspended or revoked driver's license, and resisting arrest. She defeated four other candidates in the September 4, 2018, Democratic primary and won the November 6, 2018, general election with 80% of the vote against independent challenger Michael P. Maloney. She took office on January 2, 2019.

Tenure
Rollins succeeded John P. Pappas, who was appointed by Governor Charlie Baker to serve as Suffolk County district attorney from September 26, 2018, completing the final months of Daniel F. Conley's 16-year term.

In March 2019, she laid out a memorandum on resolving petty crimes without jail time. In her capacity as district attorney, she required prosecutors to visit jails. Rollins endorsed New York City councilwoman Tiffany Cabán in the Democratic primary for Queens County District Attorney.

A study by economists at Rutgers University, Texas A&M University, and New York University found that Rollins's policy change whereby nonviolent misdemeanor offenses would not be prosecuted did not lead to an increase in crime rates and that it reduced the likelihood that nonviolent misdemeanor offenders would be arrested in the future.

Cash bail
After campaigning on a platform that included reducing the use of cash bail, Rollins has since critiqued the Massachusetts Bail Fund for securing the release of incarcerated people charged with violent felonies from pretrial detention. After a person bailed out by the Massachusetts Bail Fund allegedly committed another sexual assault following their release, Rollins became embroiled in a debate over the nature of cash bail with critics arguing that bail should not be used to keep individuals incarcerated who cannot pay and community safety should be ensured through other methods. Rollins faced further criticism when her office increased the bail of a person experiencing homelessness who was charged with armed robbery when learning he would be bailed out by the fund.

U.S. attorney for the District of Massachusetts

Nomination and confirmation
In July 2021, President Joe Biden nominated Rollins to be the United States Attorney for the District of Massachusetts. Republican U.S. Senator Tom Cotton said he would try to prevent Rollins from being confirmed, saying she supported policies that have contributed to an increase in violent crime. Senator Ted Cruz also criticized her for stating she would not prosecute certain crimes.  In September 2021, a committee vote to advance Rollins' nomination was delayed after Cotton wanted more time to convince colleagues to oppose her. 

On September 30, 2021, her nomination was stalled in committee by an 11–11 vote. On December 8, 2021, Vice President Kamala Harris cast a tie-breaking vote on the Senate's motion to invoke cloture on, as well as to confirm, Rollins's nomination. After her confirmation, the United States Marshals Service refused Rollins' request for a full time security detail, assessing that she was at a low risk of actual harm after receiving death threats via email. On January 10, 2022, she was sworn-in as the United States Attorney for the District of Massachusetts.

Controversies

In November 2022, the United States Department of Justice's inspector general reportedly opened an investigation into her for appearing at a political fundraiser with First Lady Jill Biden. The inspector general's office is also looking into alleged usage of her personal cellphone to conduct official business, raising potential security concerns. They also reportedly inquired about a June trip to California by Rollins to speak at CAA Amplify, which also paid for Rollins' trip. Justice Department employees are not permitted to accept payments for travel, and she was later asked by the Department to return the money to the group.

References

External links
Official D.A. website
'Boston District Attorney Rachael Rollins shares Six Secrets for Success with RWU School of Law'

1971 births
Living people
20th-century American women lawyers
20th-century American lawyers
21st-century American women lawyers
21st-century American lawyers
21st-century African-American women
African-American lawyers
African-American women lawyers
Massachusetts lawyers
District attorneys in Suffolk County, Massachusetts
Georgetown University Law Center alumni
Northeastern University School of Law alumni
People from Cambridge, Massachusetts
University of Massachusetts Amherst College of Education alumni
University of Massachusetts Amherst alumni
United States Attorneys for the District of Massachusetts